Patrick J. McGrath (1941 – 22 March 2021) was an Irish Gaelic footballer who played as a full-back for club side Kilmaine and was a member of the Mayo senior football team, before having a lengthy career as a referee and an administrator.

Career
As a player, McGrath played with club side Kilmaine, and was a member of the Mayo senior panel in 1966. He also played at full-back on that year's Mayo junior team. He was a referee from 1965 to 1997. McGrath was also heavily involved in GAA administration, serving as President of the Connacht Council, Trustee of the GAA and Chairman of the National Referees Committee. He served as chairman of the Mayo County Board from 1997 until 2002 when he contested the presidency of the GAA.

Death
McGrath died aged 79 on 22 March 2021.

References

1941 births
2021 deaths
All-Ireland Senior Football Championship Final referees
Chairmen of county boards of the Gaelic Athletic Association
Connacht Provincial Council administrators
Gaelic football referees
Gaelic games administrators
Irish schoolteachers
Kilmaine Gaelic footballers
Mayo County Board administrators
Mayo inter-county Gaelic footballers